Leesa Kahn is an Australian film producer who produced films such as Kokoda, In Her Skin, Sanctum, and Come Away. She started producing short films before transitioning to feature films.

Filmography

References

External links
 

Australian film producers
Year of birth missing (living people)
Living people
Place of birth missing (living people)